Kochetok is an urban-type settlement in Chuhuiv Raion of Kharkiv Oblast in Ukraine. It is located on the right bank of the Donets. Kochetok belongs to Chuhuiv urban hromada, one of the hromadas of Ukraine. Population:

Economy

Transportation
The closest railway station is in Chuhuiv, on the railway connecting Kharkiv and Kupiansk-Vuzlovyi.

The settlement is connected by road with Chuhuiv where there is road access to Highway M03 connecting Kharkiv and Sloviansk.

References

Urban-type settlements in Chuhuiv Raion